Prince Jean Charles Lamoral de La Trémoïlle of Ligne-La Trémoïlle (16 June 1911 – 9 July 2005) 13th Duke of Thouars, 12th Duke of La Trémoïlle, 15th Prince de Tarente, 19th Prince de Talmond and 19th Count of Laval was a Franco-Belgian nobleman and the only child of the French Princess Charlotte de La Trémoille and her Belgian husband, Prince Henri-Florent Lamoral of Ligne.

Upon the death of his mother in 1971, he succeeded to all her French aristocratic titles as well as disputed potential claims to the Kingdom of Jerusalem.

Family Background
Although a junior member of the House of Ligne, he founded a distinct cadet branch of that princely family: at the death of his childless maternal uncle, Louis Jean Marie de La Trémoille, prince étranger, Prince Jean Charles legally appended his maternal surname, "de La Trémoïlle", to his own in Belgium.

Marriage and Children
On 11 March 1942, he married in Paris, France Maria del Rosario de Lambertye-Gerbeviller, daughter of Charles Edmond de Lambertye, Marquis de Gerbeviller (b. 14 October 1922 in Paris). 

They had three children, all of whom married into princely families:
 Hedwige Marie (b. 1943); who married at Antoing, Belgium in 1966 to Charles de Mérode (b. 1940).
Emmanuel de Merode
 Charles-Antoine Lamoral (b. 1946), who married firstly in 1971 Lady Moira Forbes, daughter of the 9th Earl of Granard and his wife, Marie-Madeleine de Faucigny-Lucinge; after their divorce in 1975, he wed secondly at Neuilly-sur-Seine, France on 23 January 1976 Alyette de Croÿ (b. 1951), from whom he was divorced in 2002. He has issue by the second marriage:
 Edouard Lamoral Rodolphe, born in Paris in 1976, and wed at Antoing Castle 29 June 2009 to film actress (and god-daughter of Silvio Berlusconi) Isabella Orsini (born at Perugia 2 December 1974).
Althea Isabelle Sophie
Athénaïs Allegra Isabella
Antoine Tau Édouard Adrien
 Charles Lamoral Joseph Malcolm, born in Paris in 1980, and wed at Antoing Castle 20 November 2010 to Ran Li (born in Guangdong, China).
Amadeo Joseph Gabriel
 Nathalie Marie (1948–1992); who married at Saint-Georges-sur-Loire, France in 1973 to Alain de Polignac (b. 1940).

His legal title and style in Belgium was: "His Highness Jean Charles de Ligne de La Trémoïlle, Prince de Ligne."

References

1911 births
2005 deaths
Jean Charles
French nobility
Belgian nobility
Jean Charles
Dukes of Thouars
Dukes of La Trémoille
People of Byzantine descent